UGugu no Andile is a 2008 South African drama film directed by Minky Schlesinger, and starring Daphney Hlomuka, Neil McCarthy & Lungelo Dhladhla. The film received 10 nominations and won 3 awards at the 2009 Africa Movie Academy Awards, including the awards for Best film in an African language, Most Promising Actor and Most Promising Actress. It was also a competitor in the Best TV Feature category at  the 2009 FESPACO film festival in Burkina Faso, the oldest and largest film festival on the African Continent.

The story is set in South Africa in 1993, during the upheaval in the struggle for democracy. A sixteen-year-old Zulu girl Gugu is in love with a Xhosa boy Andile, against the wishes of their respective communities.

Cast
Daphney Hlomuka – Ma'Lizzie
Neil McCarthy – Father John
Litha Booi – Andile Mcilongo
Lungelo Dhladhla – Gugu Dlamini
Jabulani Hadebe – Mandla Dlamini

References

External links
 

2008 films
2008 drama films
Xhosa-language films
Zulu-language films
Best Film in an African Language Africa Movie Academy Award winners
South African drama films